The Syracuse–UConn rivalry is a sports rivalry between the Syracuse Orange of Syracuse University and the UConn Huskies of the University of Connecticut. The rivalry started in men's basketball while both schools were members of the Big East conference, and is slowly growing across other sports.

Men's basketball

History
The first game played between the two schools took place on January 27, 1956, in Syracuse, New York. Syracuse won 102–82.

The rivalry peaked while both teams were members of the Big East Conference from 1979 to 2013. The rivalry featured two Hall of Fame coaches, Jim Boeheim and Jim Calhoun.

2009 Big East Tournament
One of the highlights was the historic Big East Tournament quarterfinal game in 2009. The game took place at Madison Square Garden in New York City where Syracuse won 127-117 in a game that went to six overtimes, ending at 1:22 AM.

Post Big East
In November 2015, after the teams met in the Bahamas, both Kevin Ollie and Jim Boeheim expressed interest in renewing the rivalry. Boeheim said, "It was like an NCAA game early in the year, It's a tremendous atmosphere. A tremendous game. It really was. I think there's a reasonable likelihood that we will play Connecticut again someday soon." Ollie said, "It's something that we're definitely looking at, It would be a great thing. It's a great rivalry."

UConn and Syracuse met at the Jimmy V Classic on December 5, 2017.

Results

Football

2004 
In 2004 UConn joined the Big East conference as a football member starting an annual meeting with Syracuse. In the schools first meeting at the Carrier Dome in 2004, UConn quarterback Dan Orlovsky completed a school- and Big East-record 39 passes for a school-record 445 yards, in a 42–30 loss. 

Syracuse would later vacate wins from 2004, and 2006 for academic misconduct. The 2012 matchup was the schools final meeting as Big East conference members, with Syracuse accepting an invite to the Atlantic Coast Conference and UConn joining the American Athletic Conference. The schools met again in 2016, and 2018 as non conference opponents. Recently the schools announced a four game series starting in 2022.

Coaching connection
Former UConn head coach Randy Edsall and former offensive coordinator Frank Giufre both played football at Syracuse. Paul Pasqualoni served as head coach at Syracuse from 1991–2004 compiling a 104–59–1 record with the Orange. Pasqualoni became the head coach at UConn in 2011, only lasting two seasons with the huskies with a record of 10–18. While at UConn Pasqualoni hired his former offensive coordinator at Syracuse George DeLeone to work in the same role from 2011–2012.

Results

Women's basketball

In 2016 the UConn and Syracuse women faced off in the NCAA national championship game. UConn won the game 82–51, finishing the season with a record of 38–0 while capturing their fourth straight national championship. The teams would meet again in the Bridgeport regional of the 2017 NCAA tournament with UConn winning 94–64.

Results

References 

College football rivalries in the United States
College basketball rivalries in the United States
Syracuse Orange football
UConn Huskies football
UConn Huskies men's basketball
Syracuse Orange men's basketball
Syracuse Orange women's basketball
UConn Huskies women's basketball